Julio Sobrera (born 11 July 1927) is a Uruguayan cyclist. He competed in the individual and team road race events at the 1952 Summer Olympics.

References

External links
 

1927 births
Possibly living people
Uruguayan male cyclists
Olympic cyclists of Uruguay
Cyclists at the 1952 Summer Olympics
Pan American Games medalists in cycling
Pan American Games silver medalists for Uruguay
Cyclists at the 1955 Pan American Games